Brush-fires of the Mind is the only album by Jon Schaffer's heavy metal solo-project Sons of Liberty. The album was released on the project's website on December 18, 2009, to download for free if you sign up for the Sons of Liberty newsletter. It is also available as a high quality download, however, this one is not for free. All music and lyrics were written by Schaffer himself, he also plays all guitars and sings lead vocals.

The album has been released on CD (regular version and limited edition) and 12" vinyl by Century Media Records on July 12, 2010 

The album is a concept album about corrupt world leaders holding the rest of the world in slavery. It is a subject that Schaffer holds close to heart, as is shown on the band's website where there are links and references to literature dealing with the subject.
Between some of the songs Schaffer quotes, among others, Thomas Jefferson and Abraham Lincoln. Also, there are several speeches heard by various modern world leaders, including John F. Kennedy. Several different covers of the album exist.

Track listing
Music and lyrics written by Jon Schaffer.
"Jekyll Island"  – 7:19
"Don't Tread on Me"  – 5:08
"False Flag"  – 4:50
"Our Dying Republic"  – 3:48
"Indentured Servitude"  – 4:42
"Tree of Liberty"  – 6:11
"Feeling Helpless?"  – 4:01
"The Cleansing Wind"  – 4:33
"We the People"  – 5:18

Personnel 
Jon Schaffer – lead and backing vocals, rhythm and lead guitar, drum programming

Guest musicians
Jim Morris – guitar solos on "Jekyll Island", "Our Dying Republic", "Indentured Servitude", "The Cleansing Wind", and backing vocals and additional drum programming
Ruben Drake – bass guitar and electric stand-up bass
Troy Seele – guitar solos on "Don't Tread on Me", "Feeling Helpless"
Howard Helm – piano on "The Cleansing Wind", backing vocals
Jeff Brandt – backing vocals

References

External links
Sons of Liberty homepage

2009 debut albums
Century Media Records albums